WWWA (95.3 FM) is a radio station broadcasting a Christian adult contemporary/Praise and Worship music format. Licensed to Winslow, Maine, United States.  The station is owned by Light of Life Ministries, Inc. The station began broadcasting April 10, 1998.

On June 20, 2022, WWWA rebranded as "Reach FM".

Simulcast
WWWA's programming is simulcast on 88.1 WMEY in Bowdoin, Maine.

Previous logo

References

External links

Radio stations established in 1998
Mass media in Kennebec County, Maine
Contemporary Christian radio stations in the United States
Winslow, Maine
1998 establishments in Maine
WWA